Deleted in azoospermia protein 3 is a protein that in humans is encoded by the DAZ3 gene.

This gene is a member of the DAZ gene family and is a candidate for the human Y-chromosomal azoospermia factor (AZF). Its expression is restricted to premeiotic germ cells, particularly in spermatogonia. It encodes an RNA-binding protein that is important for spermatogenesis. Four copies of this gene are found on chromosome Y within palindromic duplications; one pair of genes is part of the P2 palindrome and the second pair is part of the P1 palindrome. Each gene contains a 2.4 kb repeat including a 72-bp exon, called the DAZ repeat; the number of DAZ repeats is variable and there are several variations in the sequence of the DAZ repeat. Each copy of the gene also contains a 10.8 kb region that may be amplified; this region includes five exons that encode an RNA recognition motif (RRM) domain. This gene contains one copy of the 10.8 kb repeat.

References

Further reading